The Calcutta Institute of Engineering and Management or CIEM is a self-financing college in West Bengal, India offering undergraduate and postgraduate courses in Engineering and Technology and other allied fields.

The college is affiliated with Maulana Abul Kalam Azad University of Technology and all the relevant programs are approved by the All India Council for Technical Education.

The campus is located along Chandi Ghosh Road at Tollygunge.

Academics 
The institute was established in 2003 and offers eight undergraduate courses:

 B.Tech. in Electronics and Communication Engineering (ECE)- 4 years [Approved intake - 60]
 B.Tech. in Electrical Engineering (EE)- 4 years [Approved intake - 120]
 B.Tech. in Civil Engineering (CE)- 4 years [Approved intake - 60]
 B.Tech. in Computer Science and Engineering (CSE)- 4 years [Approved intake - 60]
 B.Tech. in Information Technology Engineering (IT)- 4 years [Approved intake - 60]
 Bachelor in Business Administration (BBA)- 3 years [Approved intake - 40]
 Bachelor of Computer Application (BCA)- 3 years [Approved intake - 40]

A lone post-graduate course is offered: Master in Business Administration- 2 years [Approved intake - 60]

See also

References

External links
 Official website

Colleges affiliated to West Bengal University of Technology
2003 establishments in West Bengal
Engineering colleges in Kolkata
Business schools in Kolkata
Educational institutions established in 2003